This is a list of hospitals in Iran.

Bushehr 
 NAVID hospital
 Hospital Bentolhoda
 Persian Gulf Hospital
 Bushehr Heart Hospital
 Khatamalanbiya Hospital

East Azarbaijan 
 Amiralmomenin
 Sina 
 Emam Khomeyni
 Shohada
 Ali Nasab
 Asad Abadi
 Mahalati
 Behbud
 Hakima Nor
 Alavi
 Niko Kari
 Shams
 Madani
 Fajr 
 522 Artesh
 7 tir
 SHAHID BEHESHTI (MARAGHEH)
 Amiralmomenin (MARAGHEH)
 SINA (MARAGHEH)
 Hakim Jorjani

Shiraz 
 Namazi Hospital
 Poostchi Eye Hospital
 Khalily Eye Hospital
 Saadi
 Shahid Beheshti Hospital of Shiraz, previously called “Shiraz”
 Hafez
 Dena
 Chamran
 MRI
 Ordibehesht
 Shiraz is now called “Shahid Beheshti”
 Shahid Dastgheib Hospital          
 Pars
 Kosar
 Dr. Alavi
 Ali Asghar
 Dr. Mir
 Dr. Mirhoseini
 Dr. Khodadoust Eye Hospital
 Dr. Emami
 Moshir (Dr. Parhizgar) is closed
 Dr. Farahmandfar
 Shahr
 Army 576
 Kasra is closed
 Zeynabeyeh Women Hospital
 Boo Ali Sina Hospital (Shiraz Sadra)
 Ghotb-e-Din
 Moslemin
 Mental Hospital
 Madar va Koodak (Ghadir)
 Rajaii (Trauma)
 Shafa
 Be'sat
 Bimarestane Saratane Jonub Keshvar

Ilam Province 
 Kousar General Hospital (kousarhospital.ir) (https://www.instagram.com/ilam.kousar.hospital/)
 Qaem Hospital
 Tamin Ejtemayi Hospital
 Imam Khomeini Hospital
 Taleghani Hospital
 Mostafa Khomeini Hospital

Isfahan Province 
 Persian Eye Clinic
 Amir-al-momenin
 Hojjatieh
 Isebn-e-Maryam
 Dr. Shareiaty Hospital 
 Ayatollah Kashani
 Zahra-ye Zeinabiyeh
 Dr. gharazi
 Farabi
 Sina Hospital And Heart Center 
 Amin
 Hazrat sayyedo shohada
 Saadi
 Sepahan
 Mehregan
 Imam Khomeini
 Jorjani
 Noor & Ali Asghar
 Shahid Chamran
 Shahid Modarres
 Kashani
 Isfahan clinic
 Al-Zahra
 Imam Mousa Kazem
 shahid Beheshti
 Feiz
 Shahid sadughi

Kerman Province 
 Razieh Firouz
 Javadolaemeh
 Fatemieh
 Samenolaemeh
 Sajadieh
 Shafa
 Shahid Bahonar
 Nourieh Kerman
 Mehregan
 Arjmand
 Afzalipour
 Hazrat-e-Fatemeh
 Kashani

Kermanshah 
 Bistoon Private Hospital
 Emam Hoseyn
 Emam Khomeyni
 Emam Reza new 515-bed hospital 
 Farabi
 Mahdieh
 Motazedi
 Sajad (Aria)
 Sina
 Taleqani

Khorasan Razavi 
 Ali Ebne Abi Taleb
 Aria
 Artesh
 Bentolhoda
 Dr. Shariati
 Dr. Sheikh
 Emam Hadi
 Emam Javad
 Emam Reza
 Emam Sadegh
 Emam Sajad
 Emam Zaman
 Fatemieh
 Ghamar Bani Hashem
 Ghaem
 Hashemi Nezhad
 Hazrate Abolfazl
 Hazrate Zeinab
 Hefdaheh Shahrivar
 Javadolaemeh
 Madar
 Mehr
 Mousabne Jafar
 Omid
 Pasteur
 Razi
 Razavi Hospital
 Shafa
 Shahid Gandhi
 Shahinfar
 Sherkat Naft
 Sina Hospital Mashhad
 Taleghani
 Ommolbanin

Khuzestan  
 Ahvaz Imam Khomeini hospital 
 Ahvaz Abuzar Hospital 
 Ahvaz Razi hospital 
 Ahvaz Golestan Hospital 
 Ahvaz Shafa Hospital 
 Ahvaz Sinai Hospital 
 Ahvaz Salamat hospital 
 Ahvaz Oil hospital 
 Ahvaz Apadana Hospitals 
 Ahvaz Aria Hospital 
 Ahvaz Arvand hospital 
 Ahvaz Mehr Hospital 
 Ahvaz Karami Hospital 
 Ahvaz Boustan Hospital 
 Ahvaz Fatemeh Alzahra Hospital 
 Ahvaz AmirAl Momenin hospital 
 Ahvaz Amir Kabir hospital 
 Ahvaz Rajai Hospital 
 Ahvaz 578 Military Hospital 
 Ahvaz Taleghani hospital 
 Ahvaz Baghaie Hospital 
 Hendijan Shohada Hospital 
 Abadan Imam Khomeini Hospital 
 Abadan Taleghani Hospital 
 Abadan Beheshti Hospital 
 Abadan 17 Shahrivar Hospital 
 Shoshtar Alhadi Hospital 
 Shoshtar Khatam Al-Anbiya Hospital 
 Dezful Ganjavyan Hospital 
 Dezful Nabavi Hospital 
 Dezful Ya Zahra hospital 
 Dezful Afshar Hospital 
 Dezful Paygah 4 Shekary Hospital 
 Bandar Imam Khomeini Rah-Zainab Hospital 
 Omideh Imam Reza hospital 
 Omideh Iranpour Hospital
 Niyaki martyr army hospital

Markazi 
 Amir Kabir
 Ayatollah Khansari
 Ghods
 Madaen
 Vali-Asr
 Rah-ahan

Mazandaran 
 Imam Ali (Amol)
 Imam Reza (Amol)
 Shomal (Amol)
 Rouhani (Babol)
 Nimeh Shaban Hospital (Sari)
 Bu Ali Hospital (Sari)
 Imam Hospital (Sari)
 Zare'ee Hospital (Sari)
 Doctor Omidi Hospital (Behshahr)
 Amir Mazandarani Hospital (Sari)
 Hekmat Hospital (Sari) 
 Ayatollah Taleghani (Chaloos)

Qazvin 
 Dr. Rahimian
 Pars Surgical centre for Plastic, reconstructive and other surgeries; Padegan St.
 Shahid Rajaee hospital, Affiliated to Qazvin University of Medical Sciences, QUMS
 Pastour Hospital
 Velayat Hospital
 Mehregan Hospital
 Dehkhoda Hospital
 Booali Hospital

Qom 

 Kamka-Arabnia
 Hazrate Fateme Masomeh
 Beheshti University Hospital
Nekoee-Hedayati
Izadi
Alzahra
Gholpayeghani
Valiasr
Aliebnabitaleb

Semnan 
 Ayatollah Shahroudi low population

Sistan and Baluchestan 

 Ali Ebn Abitaleb (Zahedan)
 Khatam (Zahedan)
 Social security (Zahedan)
 Razi (saravan)
 Farhangian

Tehran Province 
 22nd of Bahman
 502 Artesh
 503 Artesh
 504 Artesh
 505 Artesh
 506 Artesh
 Abu Ali Sina Hospital 
 Akhtar Hospital
 Alghadir
 Ali Asghar Hospital
 Alvand
 Amir Aalam Hospital
 Amir Almoamenin Hospital
 Andarzgo
 Apadana Hospital
 Arad General Hospital
 Arash Hospital
 Asia Hospital
 Atieh Hospital 
 Ayatollah Kashani Hospital
 Ayatollah Khansari
 Ayatollah Taleghani Hospital
 Azadi Psychiatric Hospital
 Baghiyyatollah al-Azam Military Hospital
 Baharlo
 Baher Hospital
 Bahman
 Bahrami
 Bank Melli Iran's Hospital
 Beasat Hospital
 Boali Hospital
 Bozorgmehr
 Chehrazy Hospital
 Cheshm Pezeshkieh Payambaran (Ophthalmology Clinic)
 Children Medical Center
 Dadgostari
 Dey Hospital
 Dr Maseeh Daneshvari Hospital
 Dr Moairi
 Dr. Razmi
 Dr. Sapir Hospital and Charity Center
 Emam Hosein Hospital 
 Ebnesina Hospital
 Erfan Hospital 
 Esmaili (Psychiatric)
 Eyvaz Zadeh
 Fajr Hospital
 Farabi Hospital (Ophthalmology)
 Farabi Jadid
 Fayazbakhsh Hospital
 Firoozabadi Hospital
 Ghiyasi
 Hashemi Nejad
 Hazrate Fatemeh Zahra
 Hazrate Mohammad
 Hefdah-e-Shahrivar
 Hoseyniyeh Ershad
 Imam Khomeini Hospital Complex
 Imam Hossein Hospital
 Iran Hospital 
 Iranmehr Hospital
 Jamaran (Cardiology)
 Jam Hospital
 Javahery
 Jorjani Hospital
 Kasra Hospital
 Khanevadeh (Artesh)
 Khatam ol-Anbia Hospital 
 Kyan Hospital (Kyan General Hospital)
 Kourosh Heart Center
 Laleh Hospital 
 Labbafinejad Medical Center
 Loghman-o-Doleh Hakim Hospital (Includes a poison center)
 Lolagar Hospital
 Madaen Hospital
 Madar Hospital
 Madaran Hospital 
 Mahak
 Mahdieh
 Mardom Hospital
 Marghad Shahr
 Markaze Ghalbe Tehran (Cardiology)
 Marvasti Hospital
 Mehrad Hospital
 Meymanat
 Milad Hospital 
 Shahid Modarres Hospital 
 Mofarah Hospital
 Mofid Hospital
 Moghoufeh Nouh
 Moheb Hospitals 
 Najmiyeh
 Nasr
 Negah Eye Hospital 
 Nirooye Entezami No.2 Hospital
 Nirooye Entezami No.1 Hospital
 Nirooye Daryayi Hospital
 Nirooye Havaei Hospital
 No.5 Shahid Fayyazbakhsh Hospital
 Noor Afshar
 Noor Saadat 
 Noor Eye Hospital
 Omid Hospital
 Panzdah-e-Khordad
 Pars Hospital 
 Park Clinic
 Parsian Hospital 
 Pasargad Hospital
 Payambaran
 Rajayi 
 Ramtin Cardio-Vascular Research and Treatment Center
 Razi (Razani)
 Razi Hospital
 Resalat Hospital
 Rezaei (Neuropsychology)
 Roien Tan Arash
 Roozbeh Hospital 
 Sarem Women Hospital
 Sajjad Hospital
 Sevom Shaban 
 Seyedolshohada Hospital
 Shafa Yahyaian Hospital
 Shahid Andarzgou
 Shahid Ashrafi Esfahani 
 Shahid Dr Chamran 
 Shahid Dr Lavasani
 Shahid Fahmideh
 Shahid Mottahari (Burns Center)
 Shahid Rajayi
 Shahid Shariat Razavi
 Shahriar Hospital 
 Shariati Hospital 
 Sherkat Naft Hospital
 Shohaday Yaft Abad
 Shohadaye Hafte Tir
 Shohadaye Larzan
 Shohadaye Tajrish Hospital
 Sina Hospital
 Takhti (Children)
 Tavanbakhshi-e Malolin-e Zehni (Vezarat Kar and Omur Ejtemai) 
 Tehran Clinic Hospital 
 Tehran Pars
 Torfeh Hospital
 Tus Hospital
 Toos General Hospital 
 Valiasr Hospital
 Vasei Hospital
 Yaser Hospital
 Zayeshgah e Babak (Maternity Unit)
 Zayeshgah e Amin Sadeghiyeh (Maternity Unit)
 Zayeshgah-e-Eghbal (Obstetric)
 Ziaeian

West Azarbaijan 
 Ayatollah Khoyi
 IMAM REZA
AZERBAIJAN
MOTAHARI
SHAHID AREFIYAN
 IMAM KHOMEYNI

Yazd 
 Mortaz General Hospital 
 Syedolshohada
 Goudarz Hospital
 Ardakan Charity
 Hazrate Mahdi
 Ayatollah Mousavi 
 Shahid Sadoughi University of Medical Sciences

Zanjan 
 Vali-e Asr 
 Shahid Beheshti 
 Shafiiyeh 
 Ayatollah Mousavi Hospital

Golestan 
 Alejalil Hospital
 Beski Hospital
 Dezyani Hospital
 Sayad Shirazi Hospital
 5th Azar Hospital

References

External links 
 
 
 

 List
Iran
Hospitals
Iran